The Complete Plantation Recordings, subtitled The Historic 1941-42 Library of Congress Field Recordings, is a compilation album of the blues musician Muddy Waters' first recordings collected by Alan Lomax for the Library of Congress in 1941-42 and released by the Chess label in 1993. Lomax recorded Waters at Stovall Farm in Clarksdale, Mississippi in 1941 and returned the following year to make additional recordings. Thirteen tracks were originally released as Down on Stovall’s Plantation in 1966 on Testament Records.

Reception

The album was inducted into the Blues Hall of Fame in 2001 as a Classic of Blues Recording.

The AllMusic reviewer Cub Koda wrote, "At long last, Muddy's historic 1941-1942 Library of Congress field recordings are all collected in one place, with the best fidelity that's been heard thus far. ... Of particular note are the inclusion of several interview segments with Muddy from that embryonic period and a photo of Muddy playing on the porch of his cabin, dressed up and looking sharper than any Mississippi sharecropper on Stovall's plantation you could possibly imagine. This much more than just an important historical document; this is some really fine music imbued with a sense of place, time and loads of ambience."

Track listing 
All compositions credited to McKinley Morganfield except where noted
 "Country Blues" [Number One] – 3:32
 Interview #1 – 3:51 Previously unissued
 "I Be's Troubled" – 3:04
 Interview #2 – 1:50 Previously unissued
 "Burr Clover Farm Blues" – 2:54 Previously unissued
 Interview #3 – 1:13 Previously unissued
 "Ramblin' Kid Blues" [Partial] – 1:10 Previously unissued
 "Ramblin' Kid Blues" – 3:15
 "Rosalie" – 3:02
 "Joe Turner" (Writer Unknown)– 2:46
 "Pearlie May Blues" (Writer Unknown) – 3:25
 "Take a Walk With Me" – 3:04
 "Burr Clover Blues" – 3:13
 Interview #4 – 0:34 Previously unissued
 "I Be Bound to Write You" [First Version] – 3:25	
 "I Be Bound to Write You" [Second Version] – 2:52 Previously unissued	
 "You're Gonna Miss Me When I'm Gone" – 3:25
 "You Got to Take Sick and Die Some of These Days" – 2:08
 "Why Don't You Live So God Can Use You?" – 2:07
 "Country Blues" [Number Two] – 3:34	
 "You're Gonna Miss Me When I'm Gone" – 3:40 Previously unissued
 "32-20 Blues" (Robert Johnson) – 3:22 Previously unissued

Personnel 
Muddy Waters – vocals, guitar
Henry "Son" Sims – violin, acoustic guitar (tracks 7-13)
Percy Thomas – acoustic guitar, vocals (tracks 7-11)
Charles Berry – acoustic guitar (tracks 15, 16 & 22)
Louis Ford – mandolin, vocals (tracks 7-11)

References 

1993 albums
Muddy Waters albums
Chess Records albums